Radiy Faritovich Khabirov (Radiy Färit ulï Khäbirov; ; born 20 March 1964) is a Russian politician and statesman. He is the current Head of the Republic of Bashkortostan since 11 October 2018, also the Candidate of Law, Honored Lawyer of the Republic of Bashkortostan.

Biography 
Khabirov was born in the village of Sayranovo in the Ishimbaysky District of Bashkir ASSR. From 1982 until 1984, he served in the Soviet Army, and from 1984, he was a student at BashSU as well as assistant of the Department of State Law and Soviet Building of the Law Faculty in the same university and chairman of the trade union committee of students. During 1992–1994 he was an undergraduate student at Bilkent University.

From 1994 until 1998, Khabirov was a senior lecturer at the Faculty of Law, BSU. From 1998 until 2002, he served as an assistant professor and deputy dean of the Law Faculty of BSU.

From 2002 until 2003 he served as acting director and then director of the Law Institute in Bashkir State University.

Since September 2003 until July 2008, Khabirov was head of the Administration of the President of the Republic of Bashkortostan. After that he became director of the Department for Relations with the Federal Assembly of the Russian Federation and Political Parties. Since 2009, he has been a deputy head of the Presidential office on domestic policy.

From 25 January 2017, Khabirov served as an acting head of the Krasnogorsk City District. From 28 March 2017 to 11 October 2018 worked as the Head of the urban district Krasnogorsk of the Moscow Oblast.

Since October 2018, Khabirov was appointed as an acting head of Bashkortostan. Khabirov was officially elected to be the Head after the 2019 Head of the Republic of Bashkortostan election, winning 82% of the vote.

Criticism 
During the 2003 Bashkortostan presidential elections, opposition candidates allegedly found a printing house which consisted of false ballots, whom were ordered by Khabirov. 

Vladimir Korostylev, deputy prosecutor of Bashkortostan, made a statement about the involvement of Khabirov in fake ballot blanks printing, but Florid Baykov, republic’s prosecutor, disavowed the statement of his deputy, and the presidential administration designated the incident as a rude provocation of the head’s of the republic opponents. The case did not develop, however, some media outlets mentioned Khabirov as a possible side in the fake ballots incident.

During the mass protests against Bashkir President Murtaza Rakhimov which took place in 2005, Khabirov actively supported Rakhimov, calling the protests "baboon dances" and accusing the Murtaza's son Ural Rakhimov of financing the opposition.

After the appointment of Khabirov as the head of the region, the republic transferred mount Kushtau to the development of the Bashkir soda company. On 3 August 2020, deforestation began on the hill. As a result, protestors gathered in Kushtau, whom were dissatisfied with the logging and destruction of the national Bashkir heritage. On 6 August, a member of the Human Rights Council under the Head of Bashkortostan Elza Maulimshina said that police detained several activists. On 15 August, about 200 private security officers came to the hill, resulting in clashes between them and the environmental activists. The demonstrators claimed that the security officers used gas from canisters against the crowd. More than 20 activists were detained. On 16 August, Khabirov called for an end in the Kushtau development, stating that the work would remain on pause until a compromise was found.

In July 1993, Khabirov signed the Natural memorial zones of national importance creation decree, which included Kushtau in its list. In 1996, Kushtau was cataloged in the preliminary World Heritage List edition UNESCO.

Family 
Radiy Faritovich Khabirov has two daughters Svetlana and Rita from his first marriage with Larisa Lukyanova. His second wife is Karine Habirova with whom he has two children, Farit and Timer.

Sanctions
On July 2022, Khabirov was sanctioned by the British government, after his open support for the 2022 Russian invasion of Ukraine.

Awards 
 Order of Alexander Nevsky (2021)
 Order of Honour
 Order of the Republic of Crimea "For Fidelity to Duty" (2015)
Candidate Master of Sports in Greco-Roman wrestling
Honored Lawyer of the Republic of Bashkortostan (2008)
Russian Federation Presidential Certificate of Honour (2014)

References

External links 
 
 Administration of the President of the Russian Federation 

Living people
1964 births
Bilkent University alumni
United Russia politicians
Bashkir people
Russian Sunni Muslims
Heads of the Republic of Bashkortostan
People from Ishimbaysky District
Soviet Army personnel
Bashkir State University alumni
Academic staff of Bashkir State University
Scholars of constitutional law
Russian individuals subject to United Kingdom sanctions
Recipients of the Order of Alexander Nevsky
Recipients of the Order of Honour (Russia)